Wycliffe and the Dunes Mystery (1993) is a crime novel by Cornish writer W. J. Burley.

Synopsis
Fifteen years ago, Cochran Wilder supposedly vanished during a walking holiday in Cornwall just after being released from a psychiatric hospital, where he was incarcerated after successfully pleading insanity for an indecent assault charge. His father, a prominent member of parliament, regards his son as a horrible embarrassment, and is in for more professional strife when Cochran's murdered body is found buried deep inside a sand dune.

Wycliffe suspects one (or possibly even all) of six figureheads in the local community, who had been spending an illicit weekend at a Chalet near the scene of Cohran's grisly end. When a series of threatening communications begin circulating and a second murder is committed, the sleuth finds himself caught up in a deadly race against time...

References

1993 British novels
Wycliffe series
Victor Gollancz Ltd books